Patricia Bethune, sometimes credited as P.B. Hutton, (born  July 27, 1956) is an American television actress. In 2019, she received Daytime Emmy Award for Outstanding Special Guest Performer in a Drama Series at the 46th Daytime Emmy Awards for her recurring performance as evil Nurse Mary Pat on the ABC daytime soap opera, General Hospital.

Bethune has appeared in a more than 50 television shows, include Seinfeld, CSI: Crime Scene Investigation, Everybody Loves Raymond, Malcolm in the Middle, Desperate Housewives, Mad Men and How to Get Away with Murder. From 2008 to 2014, she had a recurring role as Jane Bodehouse in the HBO horror drama series, True Blood. She also had recurring roles on The Norm Show, Longmire and Grey's Anatomy.

Bethune also appeared in a number of films, including The Lost World: Jurassic Park (1997), Species III (2004), Beyond the Reach (2014) and The Open House (2018).

References

External links
 

1956 births
American television actresses
Daytime Emmy Award winners
Daytime Emmy Award for Outstanding Guest Performer in a Drama Series winners
Living people
20th-century American actresses
21st-century American actresses